Nemours Children's Hospital (NCH) is a freestanding, 130-bed, pediatric acute care children's hospital in Orlando, Florida. It is affiliated with the University of Central Florida College of Medicine and is a member of the Nemours Children's Health System, one of two hospitals in the system. The hospital provides comprehensive pediatric specialties and subspecialties to infants, children, teens, and young adults aged 0–21 throughout Orlando and features a level II pediatric trauma center. Its regional pediatric intensive-care unit and neonatal intensive care units serve the Orlando and greater Florida region. The hospital also has a helipad to transport critically ill patients to and from the hospital.

History 
When Nemours announced their plans to open a new children's hospital in Orlando, the public did not support the plan. Adversaries of the project were concerned with the fact that two children's hospitals already existed in the Orlando region and another one would duplicate services and drive prices up. Nemours filed multiple attempts to get their hospital approved and even discussed buying Arnold Palmer Hospital for Children but state officials did not see the need for another children's hospital. Nemours then started an aggressive advertising campaign talking about wanting to bring a nationally recognized children's hospital to the Orlando region. After many attempts to get their project greenlighted by state officials, Nemours was approved.

Construction of the hospital began on February 25, 2009, and was managed by architectural firm Skanska and designed by a collaboration of Stanley Beaman, Sears Atlanta Perkins, Will Boston.

The new children's hospital is a part of the Nemours Foundation and cost $397 million. The hospital is 630,000 square feet and has a maximum bed capacity of 137 beds, with only 95 operating.

In 2016 a new Ronald McDonald House with 15 bedrooms opened up adjacent to NCH with free transportation to and from the hospital.

In 2017 hospital administration announced that they would be expanding up into their 6th floor, adding 30 patient beds. In addition to 30 inpatient beds, the expansion also adds an operating room and cardiac catheterization lab. The expansion was completed in early 2020.

On May 12, 2021, the hospital announced that its name will be changed to "Nemours Children’s Hospital, Florida", in the summer of 2021.

Services
The hospital offers inpatient, outpatient, and rehabilitation services as well as a children's clinic and emergency department on the 60 acre campus.

Notable features of the new hospital include all private rooms, expanded storage spaces, and technologies to secure patient rooms and entertain patients.

Awards
In 2013 the hospital attained a LEED Gold certification due to the advanced environmental design. The hospital was the first in Florida to obtain the status, and the third children's hospital in the U.S. to be LEED Gold certified.

In 2013, the hospital was listed as one of the "Most Wired" hospitals in the U.S. by the Hospitals and Health Networks magazine.

In 2015 the hospital was ranked on the list of "The 50 Most Amazing Children’s Hospitals in the World" by Healthcare Administration DP.

In 2019 the hospital was one of three children's hospitals in Florida to earn "Top Children's Hospital" status from The Leapfrog Group, and has earned the recognition for multiple years.

See also
 List of children's hospitals in the United States
 Nemours Foundation
 Nemours Alfred I. duPont Hospital for Children
 Wolfson Children's Hospital

References

External links 
 https://www.nemours.org/locations/orlando-nemours-childrens-hospital.html
 https://www.nemours.org/welcome.html

Children's hospitals in the United States
Hospitals in Florida
Hospital buildings completed in 2012
Teaching hospitals in Florida
Hospitals established in 2012
Hospital buildings completed in 2020
Pediatric trauma centers